George Leach may refer to:

 George Leach (musician) (born 1975), Canadian musician and actor
 George Leach (cricketer) (1881–1945), English cricketer
 George E. Leach (1876–1955), United States Army general and mayor of Minneapolis

See also
 George Leech (disambiguation)